Indoor American football, or arena football, is a variation of gridiron football played at ice hockey-sized indoor arenas. While varying in details from league to league, the rules of indoor football are designed to allow for play in a smaller arena. It is distinct from traditional American or Canadian football played in larger domed or open-air stadiums, although several early college football games contested on full-sized or nearly full-sized fields at Chicago Coliseum (1890s) and Atlantic City Convention Center (1930s and 1960s) helped to show that football could be played as an indoor game.

History

Early history
The first demonstration of football on a small field was actually played outdoors at the original open-air Madison Square Garden. Using nine-man sides, Pennsylvania defeated Rutgers 10–0 at the annual meeting of the Amateur Athletic Union on January 16, 1889. 

The first documented indoor football game was an exhibition between the Springfield YMCA Training School and a Yale Senior Class team played on December 12, 1890 at Madison Square Garden II. James Naismith scored a touchdown for Springfield, though Yale won the exhibition 16–10. The following day a second exhibition game was played, with Pennsylvania defeating Rutgers 20–12.

The first documented indoor regulation football games were those played at the Chicago Coliseum in the late 1890s.  The first such game matched Michigan against Chicago on Thanksgiving Day 1896. The match was "the first collegiate game of football played under a roof." Adding to the novelty, as daylight turned to darkness, the field inside the Coliseum was lit with electric lighting. With seven acres of floor space, the sprawling Coliseum is believed to have not needed any compromises to accommodate an American football field. According to a newspaper account, the field grew dark in the second half, and play was halted for ten minutes to discuss whether play should continue. Play was resumed, and the lights were finally turned on after Michigan scored a touchdown. The press proclaimed the experiment in indoor football to be a success:

One thing at least was settled by the game, and that is, that indoor football is literally and figuratively speaking a howling success. The men had no trouble in catching punts, and football was played on its merits, without the handicaps of a wet field or a strong wind. Toward the end of the second half it got very dark, and the spectators were treated to a novelty in the shape of football by electric light."

Although both critically and commercially successful, the Coliseum was destroyed in a fire less than two years after its opening, and its replacement could not accommodate an American football field.

Later, at Madison Square Garden in 1902 and 1903, there were games known as the "World Series of Pro Football." The games were played on a 70-yard by 35-yard dirt field but otherwise adhered to outdoor rules. Poor attendance led to the tournament being discontinued after two years.

The Chicago Bears of the National Football League hosted an experimental game against their crosstown rivals, the Cardinals, after the 1930 NFL season, at the indoor Chicago Stadium. Two years later, poor weather conditions led to the Bears hosting the 1932 NFL Playoff Game against the Portsmouth Spartans (now the Detroit Lions) at the stadium. A dirt and tanbark field measuring 80 yards long (60 yards plus two ten-yard end zones) and 45 yards wide was constructed on the arena's floor. The Chicago Stadium games were notable for introducing several rule changes, including the introduction of hash marks to keep play away from spectators who were seated next to the field (much like modern indoor football), while goal posts were moved to the goal line. To compensate for the smaller field, teams were "penalized" 20 yards upon crossing midfield. (The Bears' official Web site goes further and claims that field goals were outlawed for the 1932 game.)

In 1930, the Atlantic City Convention Center constructed a nearly full-size indoor football field, and used it for one to three games a year during the 1930s; the stadium stopped hosting games in 1940 and did not resume hosting football games until 1961. In the 1960s the Boardwalk Bowl, a post-season game involving small college teams, was contested at the convention center. The Bowl was an attempt to make Atlantic City more of a year-round resort in the pre-gambling era as opposed to a single-season one (the Miss America Pageant, also held at the center, likewise began as an attempt to extend the season beyond Labor Day). The Atlantic Coast Football League played its inaugural championship game at the convention center in 1962, but the game only drew 2,000 fans and the game would thereafter move to the home stadium of the team with the best regular season record. The Philadelphia-based Liberty Bowl game, which had been played at Municipal Stadium from 1959–1963, was moved into the Convention Center in 1964 for the contest between Utah and West Virginia. The game drew just over 6,000 fans, though, and the Liberty Bowl moved to Memphis the next year, where it has remained. Unlike modern indoor football, the size of the playing surface and hence the rules were essentially the same as in the standard outdoor game, with rules updated to deal with contingencies for what could happen indoors, such as a punt striking the ceiling. The end zones were slightly shorter—eight yards instead of the standard ten (coincidentally, the eight-yard endzone length is the standard in modern indoor football).

Arena Football League

While several attempts to create a true indoor football game have been made since shortly after American football was developed, the first version to meet with relatively widespread success and acceptance was devised by Jim Foster, a former executive of the United States Football League and the National Football League. He devised his game while watching indoor soccer, another game derived from a sport played outdoors. He worked on the game in the early 1980s, but put any plans for full development of it on hold while the United States Football League, an attempt to play traditional American football in a non-traditional (spring-summer) season, was in operation in 1983–1985. When the USFL ceased operations, Foster saw his opportunity. He staged a "test" game in Rockford, Illinois in 1986 and put together a four-team league for a "demonstration season" in the spring of 1987, with games televised on ESPN.

Foster had to adopt a field that would fit within the smaller playing surfaces found in most arenas and thus created a field that was identical in size to a standard North American ice hockey rink, . This resulted in the field being 50 yards long (half of the length of a standard American football field) with eight-yard end zones (which may, if necessary, be curved in the end zones as hockey rinks are), and the field being slightly over half as wide as a standard football field. Foster adopted short-pile artificial turfs (which were then standard) such as AstroTurf for the field because of its ability to be easily rolled up when the arena is being used for other sports.

Foster adopted a modified version of eight-man football. He also mandated a one-platoon system that required at least six players to play on both offensive and defensive downs. This had the added desirable effect of limiting team payrolls.

There were numerous other rules designed to help the offense and ensure high-scoring games:
punting is banned; a team not likely to get a first down may only attempt a field goal.
the placing of taut rebound nets at the ends of the playing surface alongside the goalposts. Kicked and passed balls bouncing off these nets remain in play. In the case of a pass, the ball is live only until it touches the ground, allowing for receptions and interceptions on the rebound. On an unsuccessful field goal attempt or kickoff, the ball remains in play unless it goes out of bounds or until the player recovering it is downed by contact or scores, so on kicking plays (except an extra point attempt) either team may attempt to gain possession of the ball and advance it, much as a blocked kick could be in the traditional outdoor game. Only kicked or passed balls touching the slack nets behind the goalposts are ruled dead at that point.

To further an offensive passing advantage over the defense, Foster also imposed strict restrictions on the defensive formation, mandating that all defenses were required to play a 3-2-Monster formation with three defensive linemen, two linebackers, two cornerbacks, and one safety. Linebackers were not permitted to blitz and were required to stay in boxes behind the line of scrimmage, while defensive linemen were hindered by restrictions that prevented them from using certain techniques to penetrate the offensive line. Quarterbacks and placekickers were exempt from the one-platoon system, allowing two key scoring positions to be more specialized. The AFL also adopted the USFL's concept of playing in the late spring and summer, since this is when most hockey and basketball arenas have the fewest schedule conflicts (only competing with touring stadium rock concerts). The spring schedule has since been adopted by virtually all other professional indoor leagues as of 2010.

Within a year of the AFL kicking off, its first challenger, the World Indoor Football League formed. The WIFL planned to play a schedule with six teams beginning in summer of 1988 with its own set of indoor-inspired rules, including an unusual system that would have eight men on offense and seven men on defense. Despite having backing from former NFL players, veteran coaches, and singer John Mellencamp, the league canceled its 1988 season, folded half of its franchises (including Mellencamp's), and made an unsuccessful bid for the remaining three teams to join the AFL; the WIFL never played a single game.

In 1990, Foster patented the rules of arena football, meaning that only persons authorized by him could use his rules and his name for the sport. While the AFL asserted throughout the 1990s that the patent covered virtually every aspect of the game (from the 50-yard field to the eight-man format), a 1998 lawsuit (Arena Football League v. Professional Indoor Football League) established that the patent specifically covered the rebound net feature, meaning that competitors could not use this aspect of the rules. However, under provisions of U.S. patent law, Foster's patent expired on March 27, 2007, enabling competitors to use rebound nets (at least as originally envisioned, without other innovations that he may have patented).

The AFL signed a major network television broadcasting contract with NBC, and eventually launched an official minor league, af2, beginning in 2000. This effort basically served two purposes: one as a developmental league for the AFL, and as a place where former collegiate players could develop while at the same time learning and becoming accustomed to the unique arena rules, and secondly as a pre-emptive way of shutting out potential new indoor football competitors (this was especially important as the 2007 expiration of Foster's patent on the rebound nets approached). At times over forty teams participated in this league, almost uniformly in cities which also had minor league ice hockey teams and hence suitable arenas.

Shortly before the end of 2008, the Arena Football League announced that it would not be playing a 2009 spring season. During the previous few years, the league administrators and team owners had allowed player salaries and other costs to rise to the point where the league and many of the teams were losing a substantial amount of money. Late in the summer of 2009, with the team owners unable to agree on a plan for making the league viable again the AFL announced that it was folding, eventually putting its assets up in a Chapter 7 bankruptcy liquidation.

The developmental af2, however, played its 2009 season as scheduled. Most of the teams made a sustainable profit and the team owners were eager to see the league continue for another year. However, with the AFL owning 50.1% of the af2, it would fold if the AFL folded. At the end of the 2009 season, a gathering of af2 and remaining AFL team owners set out to form their own organization, originally known as Arena Football 1 (AF1). AF1 went on to purchase all assets of the original AFL and af2, except for a few team names and logos owned by outside parties, in a December 2009 bankruptcy auction. Shortly after the purchase, AF1 adopted the Arena Football League name, and the AFL relaunched in 2010. The "iron man" rule, requiring at least six of the eight players to play on both offense and defense, was dropped, but most other past AFL rules remained unchanged. The relaunched league saw franchises return and renewed interest, but by the end of the 2017 season, almost all of the league's teams had either folded or moved to other leagues, with only the Philadelphia Soul having existed prior to 2016. Five expansion teams, all in the Mid-Atlantic United States, were established over the next two years, before the league announced after the 2019 season that it was dissolving in a second Chapter 7 bankruptcy.

Other indoor leagues

Other indoor football leagues have been formed, without the use of the rebound nets at the ends of the field. Like the AFL, their playing seasons are entirely or primarily outside the traditional fall/early winter season of the outdoor sport so as not to be competing with it directly for fan support.

Since the first such league, the Professional Indoor Football League, began play in the 1998, there has often been a pattern of instability. Each off-season has seen teams jumping from league to league. In addition, leagues have annually merged, changed names, and separated. The organization that was most recently known as American Indoor Football (AIF) went through three names and two ownership changes in its first three seasons. Several other indoor leagues have been announced without ever actually commencing play, or operating only briefly with a handful of teams. Some were claimed attempts to form a second "major" league of indoor football while others were strictly efforts to form a new "minor" league.

A few leagues have achieved a certain level of stability, however. The National Indoor Football League (NIFL) began in 2001 and was the most successful league in the early 2000's. The Indoor Football League (IFL) began in the autumn of 2008 when two already-established leagues (the Intense Football League and United Indoor Football) chose to merge into a single organization. The IFL's expansion model has been based less on establishing new teams and more on acquiring existing teams from other leagues. The IFL has 14 teams as of 2020. Other, regional leagues include Champions Indoor Football (CIF), the American Arena League (AAL) and National Arena League (NAL). Both CIF and the AAL were formed by mergers of existing leagues. The CIF was formed from a merger of the Champions Professional Indoor Football League and the Lone Star Football League in 2015. The AAL was formed in late 2017 as the combination of three leagues that each played one season: the Can-Am Indoor Football League, Arena Pro Football, and Supreme Indoor Football.

Fan Controlled Football launched in 2021 following an interactive format inspired by video games, with "power-ups" and fans voting on plays. It generally targeted a higher caliber of player than the typical indoor league, with outdoor football veterans such as Johnny Manziel, Robert Turbin, Quinton Flowers, Quinn Porter, Shawn Oakman and Josh Gordon playing in the league's inaugural season.

The best-known indoor women's football league is the Legends Football League (formerly known as the Lingerie Football League). Known for its scantily-clad players and its signature event, the Legends Cup (formerly Lingerie Bowl), the LFL played a variant of indoor rules with most of its games in indoor stadiums, although few teams experimented with playing in outdoor stadiums. The league's brief foray into Australia was played in outdoor stadiums; these teams nevertheless played under indoor football rules. All other women's leagues play on outdoor fields with outdoor rules; there have been several other attempts to form indoor women's football leagues, but none have made it to play.

Compensation
All current indoor football teams play at a minor league or semi-professional level. The average player's salary in the Arena Football League was US$1,800 per game in 2008; this is about one-quarter of the Canadian Football League (adjusted for inflation). Players in af2 were paid $250 per game and the AIFA and IFL had per-game salaries of $200 per game; the AFL paid $885 per game for most players in 2012, with that number rising to $940 per game in 2013 (although players then had to pay for their own housing, which the league previously provided); starting quarterbacks receive a $300 per game bonus. As of 2019, the IFL pays $200–$300 per game, with a $25 bonus for each win. FCF pays $400 to $750 a week.

Connection to the NFL
Green Bay Packers head coach Matt LaFleur was a quarterback for the Omaha Beef and the Billings Outlaws in the National Indoor Football League (NIFL). Running back Fred Jackson rushed for over 1,000 yards as the starting running back for the 2009 Buffalo Bills, and his high quality play earned him a spot on USA Today's "All-Joe" Team. Jackson played the early part of his professional football career for the Sioux City Bandits (now of Champions Indoor Football) and Michael Lewis (wide receiver) played for the Louisiana Bayou Beast in 1999 and then with the New Orleans Saints. Probably the most notable player to come out of Arena football into the National Football League is Kurt Warner, MVP quarterback of the Super Bowl XXXIV champion (2000 game, 1999 season) St. Louis Rams, who had previously quarterbacked the former Iowa Barnstormers of the AFL.  The National Football League removed a ban that had been in place on any of its owners owning teams in any other sort of football operation with respect to Arena football only, and several of them had bought or started Arena teams at one point. However, the NFL allowed to lapse an option it had negotiated allowing it to purchase up to 49% of Arena football, and as of early 2007 seemed to have backed away from any plan it may have had to use Arena football as a developmental league in any sort of "official" sense, perhaps in the interest of not undermining its then-existing "official" developmental league, NFL Europa.

Several NFL owners owned Arena Football League teams in their own cities prior to the league's bankruptcy. At the end of the 2008 season, Jerry Jones and the Dallas Desperados (who had similar colors and logos to the Dallas Cowboys), Arthur Blank's Georgia Force, and the  Colorado Crush (whose shareholders included Broncos owner Pat Bowlen and Rams then-minority owner Stan Kroenke) were still in the league. San Francisco 49ers owner Denise DeBartolo York and the Washington Commanders owner Daniel Snyder had future expansion rights to their respective cities.  Tom Benson's original New Orleans VooDoo and Bud Adams's Nashville Kats had already folded prior to the bankruptcy and none of the NFL owners with AFL franchises returned to the league after its reformation in 2010, and most favored abolishing the league entirely.

Two players and one owner with substantial contributions (at least the majority of one season) have reached the Pro Football Hall of Fame: 2017 inductee Kurt Warner played the first three seasons of his professional career in the AFL, 2018 inductee Terrell Owens played his last professional season with the Indoor Football League in 2012, and the aforementioned Pat Bowlen was inducted into the Hall in 2019.

Dozens of former and current professional outdoor football players also have invested money into indoor football franchises.

Leagues
The following is a list of professional arena and indoor football leagues:

Current leagues
Indoor Football League; 2008–present ( years)
Champions Indoor Football; 2015–present ( years)
National Arena League; 2017–present ( years)
American Arena League; 2018–present ( years)
American West Football Conference; 2019–present ( years)
Fan Controlled Football, 2021–present ( years)
Arena Football Association, 2021–present ( years)
X League, 2022–present ( year)
Arena Football League (III), 2023–present

Defunct leagues

arenafootball2; 2000–2009
American Indoor Football; 2007–2010, 2012–2016
Atlantic Indoor Football League; 2005–2006
American Professional Football League; 2003–2012
Arena Football League (I); 1987–2008
Arena Football League (II); 2010–2019
Arena Pro Football; 2017 — Merged with Can-Am to form AAL in 2018
Can-Am Indoor Football League; 2017 — Merged with APF to form AAL in 2018
Champions Professional Indoor Football League; 2013–2014 — Merged with LSFL to form CIF in 2015
Continental Indoor Football League; 2006–2014
Independent Indoor Football Alliance; 2007–2011
Indoor Football League; 1999–2000
Indoor Professional Football League; 1999–2001
Intense Football League; 2004, 2006–2008 — Merged with United Indoor Football to become IFL
Legends Football League:
 Canada: 2012
 Australia: 2013–2014
Lone Star Football League; 2012–2014 — Merged with CPIFL to form CIF in 2015
National Indoor Football League; 2001–2007
North American Indoor Football League; 2005
Professional Indoor Football League; 1998
Professional Indoor Football League; 2012–2015
Southern Indoor Football League; 2008–2011
Supreme Indoor Football; 2017 — Professional teams joined AAL; league announced to become a development league
Ultimate Indoor Football League; 2011–2014
United Indoor Football; 2005–2008 — Merged with Intense Football League to become IFL
World Indoor Football League; 1988 — Never played
World Indoor Football League; 2007
X-League Indoor Football; 2014–2015 — Merged into North American Indoor Football
Xtreme Football League; 1999 — Never played, merged with af2

References

External links

 
Arena Football League
Variations of American football
it:Indoor football